Lorance may refer to:

 Clint Lorance, former United States Army officer
 Cheryl Anne Lorance, American sculptor, painter, goldsmith, and intaglio printmaker
 Lorance Township, Bollinger County, Missouri in Missouri, United States

See also 
 Lorence
 Loran (disambiguation)